PIV may refer to:

Science and technology
 Particle image velocimetry, an optical method of flow visualization
 Peak inverse voltage, in electronics
 Pentium 4 microprocessor, produced by Intel ("IV" is Roman numeral for "4")
 Personal Identity Verification, as specified by the US federal government standard FIPS 201
 Posterior interventricular artery, an artery supplying the heart
 Positive input ventilation, a type of ventilation for buildings
 Post indicator valve, a shut-off valve for otherwise underground pipes, notably for fire sprinklers; see Glossary of firefighting equipment#P
 Pivaloyl protecting group (Piv), a protecting group 
 P = IV, the formula describing power in terms of current and voltage in electrical power 
 Parainfluenza virus, single-stranded RNA viruses belonging to the Paramyxoviridae family

Other uses
 Plena Ilustrita Vortaro de Esperanto, a dictionary of Esperanto
 Vaeakau-Taumako (ISO 639 language code), a Polynesian language

See also
 Peripheral intravenous catheter (PIVC), in medicine